Major General Bennett C. Landreneau (retired), born October 4, 1947, was a major general who served for fourteen years as the Adjutant General for the Louisiana National Guard.

Formal education
MG Landreneau graduated from Vidrine High School in Ville Platte, Louisiana and holds a Bachelor of Science degree in agronomy from the University of Southwestern Louisiana. In 1995, he graduated from the United States Army War College in Carlisle, Pennsylvania.

Military career
In June 1969, Landreneau enlisted in the Louisiana National Guard as a private. In 1971, he attended Louisiana State Officer Candidate School, where he was issued a commission as a second lieutenant. He served as a platoon leader in the 3671st Maintenance Company (LAARG, Alexandria, Louisiana), and again with Detachment 1 Company C, 769th Engineer Battalion, (LAANG, Jena, Louisiana). In September 1973, he was awarded his first military command with Detachment 1, 2225th Engineer Company, (LAANG, Jena, Louisiana). In October 1978, after commanding the 2225th Engineer Company, Company C, 527th Engineer Battalion, and Company A, 527th Engineer Battalion, he transitioned to staff duties in Operations (S-3). In September 1986, he took command of 527th Engineer Battalion, (LAANG, Bossier City, Louisiana). In December 1990, the Battalion was mustered into the National Guard of the United States under Title 10 of the United States Code, where it deployed to Saudi Arabia in support of Operation Desert Storm. In September 1995, he became the commander of the 256th Infantry Brigade headquartered in Lafayette, Louisiana, where he served for two years before appointment to The Adjutant General headquartered in New Orleans, Louisiana. Landreneau, as a major general, held the position of The Adjutant General of the Louisiana National Guard for fourteen years until Brigadier General Glenn H. Curtis assumed command in November 2011.

Military awards
 Legion of Merit (with 1 Oak Leaf Cluster)
 Bronze Star Medal
 Meritorious Service Medal (with 1 Oak Leaf Cluster)
 Army Commendation Medal
 Army Achievement Medal
 Army Reserve Components Achievement Medal (with 1 Silver Oak Leaf Cluster)
 National Defense Service Medal
 Southwest Asia Service Medal (with 2 Bronze Service Stars)
 Humanitarian Service Medal
 Armed Forces Reserve Medal (with Hourglass Device and M Device)
 Army Service Ribbon
 Army Reserve Components Overseas Training Ribbon (with Numeral One)
 Kuwait Liberation Medal (Saudi Arabia)
 Kuwait Liberation Medal (Kuwait)

Personal life
Landreneau is married to Dolores (née Fontenot); they have four children and six grandchildren. General Landreneau worked for the United States Department of Agriculture - Natural Resources Conservation Service for over 30 years and retired as the assistant state conservationist in 1996 before appointment to the adjutant general of the Louisiana National Guard. While working with the USDA, he received two USDA Distinguished Service awards and one USDA Superior Service award.

References

United States Army generals
People from Louisiana
Living people
Recipients of the Legion of Merit
1947 births